Bleasby may refer to:
Bleasby, Nottinghamshire, England
Bleasby, Lincolnshire, England